The Actors Workshop is one of southern California's oldest film acting programs and is generally associated with the Sanford Meisner and Charles Conrad techniques. The company was established by its parent company, Shannon & Company.

Overview
Founded by Film/TV actor R.J. Adams in 1980, The Actors Workshop has been training aspiring and professional young film/television actors in both Los Angeles and Orange County, California.  Throughout the years a number of well-known industry directors and casting directors from Universal Television, Warner Brothers, Columbia Pictures, Lorimar TV, NBC, CBS and ABC have been affiliated with the workshop and continue to make bi-monthly guest appearances on a monthly basis. The school has bolstered the career of many well-known actors who have appeared in dozens of starring and co-starring Film/Television roles. R.J. Adams' son Rob Adams now owns and runs The Actors Workshop and has been coaching young actors for twenty nine years. Rob Adams is credited with coaching such stars as Sarah Lancaster, Warren G, Wayne Bastrup, Annet Mahendru and Tiffany.
Today The Actors Workshop is currently ranked as the number 3 Best acting school in California.

Studio facility
In early 1990, the workshop added a Television studio. The studio is used for training, filming auditions, demo reels and overall growth of the students. Through the years, Television and film directors such as Dennis Steinmetz, Richard Compton, Ron Stephenson, Corey Allen and Michael O'Herlihy make regular appearances at the school. Casting directors from major television stations CBS, NBC and production companies  Lorimar, 20th century looked for prospects at weekly showcases.

Notable alumni
Brian Krause
Kristy Swanson
Sarah Lancaster
Vicellous Reon Shannon
Annet Mahendru
Quinton Jackson
Wayne Bastrup
 Hank Stone
Schae Harrison
Christopher Knight
Eric Norris
Tiffany
Warren G
Sugar Lyn Beard
David Farkas

References

External links
 
 Film/TV acting insights
 Actors resources
 Film/TV Industry news

Film schools in California
Education in Los Angeles
Education in Orange County, California
1980 establishments in California
Educational institutions established in 1980